Madaya is a small mountainous town in Syria, located at an altitude of around . According to locals in the area Lake Barada used to be bigger but due to pollution and industrial causes it has shrunk. Madaya often is snow-top during the winter months especially on January and February. According to the Syria Central Bureau of Statistics (CBS), Madaya had a population of 9,371 in the 2004 census. Its inhabitants are predominantly Sunni Muslims. Madaya is home to a large illegal market home to foreign brands that are smuggled in from Lebanon's Chtaura, which is close to the area.

History

Syrian civil war

Since July 2015, the town has been besieged by a combination of Syrian forces loyal to the Syrian president Bashar al-Assad and the allied Lebanese militia Hezbollah. In December 2015, Doctors Without Borders reported that 23 people had died of starvation after a total blockade prevented any food or humanitarian aid to enter since 18 October. United Nations Secretary General Ban Ki-Moon expressed alarm at the situation in Madaya as well as in other besieged areas in Syria, and warned that the use of starvation as weapon during conflict is a war crime.

On 7 January 2016, the UN Office for the Coordination of Humanitarian Affairs issued a statement calling for unimpeded access to deliver emergency assistance to Madaya,  Al-Fu'ah and Kafriya. Amid calls from United Nations officials and dozens of humanitarian organizations to intervene, the United Nations negotiated a deal between the Syrian government and rebels holding the town to allow for the delivery of humanitarian aid, which was carried out on 11 January 2016.

On 14 April 2017, the 2015 Zabadani cease-fire agreement was implemented, and 60 buses transported 2,350 people, including 400 rebels, from Madaya and Zabadani to Idlib.

References

Bibliography

External links
Map of location

Populated places in Al-Zabadani District
Towns in Syria